Narim may refer to:
 Narim people, an ethnic group in South Sudan
 Narim, a fictional character in the television series Stargate SG-1

See also
 Narym